Gordon Stanley Trenouth (November 3, 1886 – June 8, 1956) was a Canadian professional ice hockey player. He played with the Toronto Shamrocks and the Toronto Blueshirts of the National Hockey Association.

He also played with the Sydney Millionaires in the Maritime Professional Hockey League.

References

1886 births
1956 deaths
Canadian ice hockey defencemen
Ice hockey people from Saskatchewan
Toronto Blueshirts players
Toronto Shamrocks players